Harold Eugene "Hal" Goldsmith  (August 18, 1898 – October 20, 1985) was a pitcher in Major League Baseball. He played for the Boston Braves from 1926 through 1928 and the St. Louis Cardinals in 1929. He had a career 4.04 earned run average as a professional. Goldsmith played collegiately at St. Lawrence University.

References

External links

1898 births
1985 deaths
Baseball players from New York (state)
Boston Braves players
Major League Baseball pitchers
People from Riverhead (town), New York
St. Lawrence Saints baseball players
St. Louis Cardinals players
Clarksdale Cubs players